Herbert Henry Lieberman (born September 22, 1933 in New Rochelle, New York) is a mystery/crime novelist and playwright.
 
Liberman's mother was an orphan who fled Romania and came over to America on the Lusitania. She married Abraham Lieberman, of New Rochelle, New York.

He received his AB from City College of New York and his AM from Columbia University. In 1977 he won the Grand Prix de Littérature Policière's International Prize for City of the Dead.  He is a former managing editor of the Reader's Digest Book Club.

Personal life
Lieberman married Judith Barsky, and they have one daughter, and twin granddaughters.

Lierberman, as a teenager, used to work at a soda pop shop. When he grew up, he worked at the New York Reader's Digest Book Club. Currently, he  lives in California with his wife, and his wire-haired dachshund, Henry.

His horror novels were based upon nightmares which he had.

Novels
The Adventures of Dolphin Green (1967)
Crawlspace (1971)
The Eighth Square (1973)
Brilliant Kids (1975)
City of the Dead (1976)
The Climate of Hell (1978)
Night Call from a Distant Time Zone (1982)
Nightbloom (1984)
The Green Train (1986)
Shadow Dancers (1989)
Sandman, Sleep (1993)
The Girl with the Botticelli Eyes (1996)
The Concierge (1998)
The Vagabond of Holmby Park (2003)

Plays produced and cinematography
Matty, the Moron, and Madonna, directed by Jose Quintero at The Orpheum Theatre (Manhattan), won the University of Chicago Charles E. Sergel Drama Award.
Tigers in Red Weather, produced by the Minnesota Theatre Company
Crawlspace was a TV movie, adapted from Lieberman's novel. It was directed by John Newland and Buzz Kulik, and it starred Arthur Kennedy, Teresa Wright, and Tom Happer.

References 

1933 births
Living people
20th-century American novelists
21st-century American novelists
American male novelists
American mystery writers
City College of New York alumni
Columbia University alumni
Writers from New Rochelle, New York
20th-century American male writers
21st-century American male writers
Novelists from New York (state)